José Salamanca may refer to:

 Eliseo Salamanca
 José Salamanca y Mayol, Spanish businessman, politician and noble